Lukáš Jurík (born February 20, 1982) is a Slovak professional ice hockey player who is currently a free agent.

Jurík spent the majority of his career playing for his hometown team HKm Zvolen in the Slovak Extraliga. He also played in the same league for MsHK Žilina, HK Spišská Nová Ves and HC Nové Zámky.

External links

1982 births
Living people
HC '05 Banská Bystrica players
Sportovní Klub Kadaň players
Metallurg Zhlobin players
HC Nové Zámky players
HC Slavia Praha players
Slovak ice hockey centres
HK Spišská Nová Ves players
HC TWK Innsbruck players
MsHK Žilina players
HKM Zvolen players
Sportspeople from Zvolen
Slovak expatriate ice hockey players in the Czech Republic
Expatriate ice hockey players in Belarus
Expatriate ice hockey players in Austria
Expatriate ice hockey players in Latvia
Slovak expatriate sportspeople in Austria
Slovak expatriate sportspeople in Latvia
Slovak expatriate sportspeople in Belarus